Roman Andreyevich Gribovsky (born 17 July 1995) is a Belarusian professional footballer who is currently playing for Neman Grodno.

References

External links

Profile at Pressball

1995 births
Living people
People from Mogilev
Sportspeople from Mogilev Region
Belarusian footballers
Association football forwards
FC Belshina Bobruisk players
FC Dnepr Mogilev players
FC Lida players
FC Luch Minsk (2012) players
FC Dnyapro Mogilev players
FC Minsk players
FC Neman Grodno players